Ateleia popenoei is a species of flowering plant in the family Fabaceae. It is found only in Bahamas and is not threatened as there are substantial areas which have not been settled by humans.

References

Swartzieae
Flora of the Bahamas
Data deficient plants
Taxonomy articles created by Polbot